The BICh-3 was a tailless research aircraft designed and built in the USSR in 1926.

Development 
After Cheranovsky's first tailless flying wing gliders, the BICh-1 and BICh-2, he continued developing the concept with the BICh-3. The BICh-3 was built of wood with a parabolic wing having a straight trailing edge and a curved leading edge. The cockpit was faired into a large fin and rudder. The undercarriage consisted of a faired central mono-wheel with wing-tip skids.
The BICh-3 was flown in Moscow in 1926. It was found to be unstable in initial tests leading to modifications that improved the handling sufficiently for it to be cleared as safe to fly.

Specifications (BICh-3)

See also

References

 Gunston, Bill. “The Osprey Encyclopaedia of Russian Aircraft 1875 – 1995”. London, Osprey. 1995.

External links

 http://www.ctrl-c.liu.se/misc/RAM/bich-3.html
 https://web.archive.org/web/20091027081510/http://www.geocities.com/unicraftmodels/on/bich3/bich3.htm
 https://web.archive.org/web/20110309083324/http://jroger.net/berliweb/tcheranovsky/page_tcheranovsky.htm - archival photographs

1920s Soviet and Russian experimental aircraft
Chyeranovskii aircraft
tailless aircraft
Aircraft first flown in 1926